The Solihull Metropolitan Borough Council elections were held on Thursday, 3 May 1990, with one third of the council to be elected. There had been a number of by-elections the previous year, with the net result being Liberal Democrat gains from the Conservatives in Shirley East and the Independent Ratepayers & Residents in Packwood. The Conservatives narrowly retained control of the council. Voter turnout was 49.5%.

Election result

|- style="background-color:#F9F9F9"
! style="background-color: " |
| Independent Ratepayers & Residents 
| align="right" | 2
| align="right" | 1
| align="right" | 0
| align="right" | +1
| align="right" | 11.8
| align="right" | 7.1
| align="right" | 5,499
| align="right" | +1.0%
|-

This result had the following consequences for the total number of seats on the council after the elections:

Ward results

|- style="background-color:#F6F6F6"
! style="background-color: " |
| colspan="2"   | Independent Ratepayers hold 
| align="right" | Swing
| align="right" | -4.4
|-

|- style="background-color:#F6F6F6"
! style="background-color: " |
| colspan="2"   | Independent Ratepayers gain from  Conservative
| align="right" | Swing
| align="right" | +29.7
|-

By-elections between 1990 and 1991

|- style="background-color:#F6F6F6"
! style="background-color: " |
| colspan="2"   | Independent Ratepayers gain from  Conservative
| align="right" | Swing
| align="right" | +29.7
|-

References

1990 English local elections
1990
1990s in the West Midlands (county)